José Contreras (born 1971) is a Cuban Major League Baseball pitcher.

José Contreras may also refer to:

José Castellanos Contreras (1893–1977), Salvadoran military officer and diplomat who rescued Jews during the Holocaust
José Alirio Contreras (born 1978), Venezuelan cyclist
José Contreras (footballer, born 1982), Chilean football right-back
José Manuel Contreras (born 1986), Guatemalan football midfielder
José Contreras (footballer, born 1994), Venezuelan football goalkeeper
José Miguel Contreras, Canadian rock singer and guitarist of By Divine Right

See also
Contreras surname